KDVI may refer to:

 KDVI (FM), a radio station (89.9 FM) licensed to Devil's Lake, North Dakota, United States
 a KDE based document viewer, see Okular
KdVI, Korteweg-de Vries Institute for Mathematics